The 2021 World Triathlon Cross Championships was the 10th edition of the World Triathlon Cross Championships organized by World Triathlon. It was held in Guijo de Granadilla, Spain, from 29 to 31 October 2021. Medals were awarded in Elite, Under-23, Junior, Group age and Para-Cross triathlon. World Triathlon organized the 2021 Aquathlon World Championships in the same date and venue. It was the 3rd edition on Spanish soil and second on El Anillo circuit.

Results
Swiss Loanne Duvoisin and French Arthur Serrieres lifted their first World Championship trophy in the Elite category. They both had strong bike and run legs to come up victorious

Men

Women

References

External links
Official event website
Complete Results for 2021 Duathlon World Championships

World Championships
International sports competitions hosted by Spain
Triathlon competitions in Spain
World Triathlon Cross Championships
World Triathlon Cross Championships